Manan Chandra (born 28 February 1981 in New Delhi) is an Indian amateur snooker and pool player.

Chandra reached the semi final at the 2006 IBSF World Championships in Amman, Jordan, where he was eliminated by Daniel Ward 8–7. Chandra is married to Anuja Thakur, who is also a successful Indian amateur snookers and billiards player.

Partnering with Pankaj Advani, Manan Chandra won the IBSG Snooker Team World Cup in 2018 when they defeated the Pakistan2 team of Muhammad Asif and Babar Masih 3–2.

References

External links
 http://www.cuesportsindia.com/myweb/profile/manan.htm

Living people
1981 births
Indian snooker players
Cue sports players at the 2010 Asian Games
Cue sports players at the 2006 Asian Games
Cue sports players at the 2002 Asian Games
Cue sports players from Delhi
Asian Games competitors for India